The Charles Rees Award is granted by the Royal Society of Chemistry to "reward excellence in the field of heterocyclic chemistry". It was established in 2008 and is awarded biennially. The winner receives £2000, a medal and a certificate, and delivers a lecture at the Lakeland Symposium, Grasmere, UK. Winners are chosen by the Heterocyclic and Synthesis Group, overseen by the Organic Division Awards Committee.

Previous winners
Source: Royal Society of Chemistry
 2018 – Andrew Smith, University of St Andrews, " for the development of organocatalysis methodology to synthesise new heterocyclic ring systems"
 2016 – , University of Strathclyde, "for his highly innovative studies on the preparation, properties and applications of very reactive heterocycles" 
 2014 – , University of Oxford, "for his multiple contributions to modern heterocyclic chemistry".
 2012 – , University of Nottingham, "in recognition of his numerous outstanding contributions to heterocyclic chemistry, including the synthesis of a variety of heterocycles of biological interest, over a period of many years".
 2010 – Anthony Barrett, Imperial College London, "in recognition of his outstanding contributions to synthetic and heterocyclic chemistry ranging from the total synthesis of complex natural products to the synthesis of multimetallic porphyrazine arrays."

See also

 List of chemistry awards

References

Awards of the Royal Society of Chemistry
Awards established in 2008
2008 establishments in the United Kingdom